Legend for Numeric Designations
CL:  Lockheed Corporation
D: Douglas Aircraft Company
NA: North American Aviation
WS (Weapon System)

Weapon System was a United States Armed Forces military designation scheme for experimental weapons (e.g., WS-220) before they received an official name — e.g., under a military aircraft designation system. The new designator reflected the increasing complexity of weapons that required separate development of auxiliary systems or components.

In November 1949, the Air Force decided to build the Convair F-102 Delta Dagger around a fire-control system. This was "the real beginning of the weapon system approach [and the] aircraft would be integrated into the weapon system "as a whole from the beginning, so the characteristics of each component were compatible with the others".

Around February 1950, an Air Research and Development Command "study prepared by Maj Gen Gordon P. Saville...recommended that a 'systems approach' to new weapons be adopted [whereby] development of a weapon "system" required development of support equipment as well as the actual hardware itself."

The first WS designation was  WS-100A.

US weapon programs were often begun as numbered government specifications such as an Advanced Development Objective (e.g., ADO-40) or a General Operational Requirement (e.g., GOR.80), although some programs were initially identified by contractor numbers (e.g., CL-282).

List of Weapon Systems

Notes

References

United States military-related lists